Moll can refer to:

As a name 
 Moll (surname)
 Moll Anderson, interior designer, life stylist, author, and former national iHeart Radio host
 Moll Anthony, aka Mary Lesson (1807–1878), Irish bean feasa (wise-woman)
 Moll Cutpurse, an alias of Mary Frith (c. 1584–1659), notorious London pickpocket and fence
 Moll Davis (c. 1648–1708), entertainer and courtesan, singer, and actress, mistress to King Charles II of England
 Moll Dyer (died c. 1697?), a possibly legendary woman accused of witchcraft and driven out of her town
 Moll King, an alias of Elizabeth Adkins (1696–1747), proprietor of a notorious London establishment, first with her husband, then alone
 Moll O'Driscoll, Irish Gaelic footballer
 Moll Pitcher, born Mary Diamond (c. 1736-1813), a clairvoyant and fortune-teller
 Aethelwold Moll, King of Northumbria 759-765

Fictional characters 
 Moll Flanders, the title character in the novel by Daniel Defoe
 Moll Hackabout, the unfortunate prostitute portrayed in William Hogarth's A Harlot's Progress
 Moll, a character in the 1937 musical The Cradle Will Rock by Marc Blitzstein

Slang term 
 Gun moll, gangster moll or gangster's moll, the female companion of a hoodlum or gangster
 Moll (slang), in Australia and New Zealand, a woman with loose sexual morals

Other uses 
 Minor scale, in music
 Moll, Skye, a location in Highland, Scotland
 Möll, a river of Austria
 , a Spanish grape variety
 Manto negro, another Spanish wine grape variety that is also known as Moll

See also 
 Moll's Gap, a mountain pass in County Kerry, Ireland
 Molly, a given name
 Mol (disambiguation)